Marun Dam, also spelled Maroun, is a rock-fill embankment dam on the Marun River about  north of Behbahan in Behbahan County, Khuzestan Province, Iran. The dam serves to provide water for irrigation and to generate hydroelectric power as well. Construction on the dam began in 1989 and it was completed in 1998. A smaller Marun-II regulator dam is planned downstream. The 150 MW power station was commissioned in 2004.

See also

List of power stations in Iran
Jam Arjan

References

Hydroelectric power stations in Iran
Dams in Khuzestan Province
Dams completed in 1998
Energy infrastructure completed in 2004
2004 establishments in Iran
Rock-filled dams
Behbahan County
Dams in the Tigris–Euphrates river system
Buildings and structures in Khuzestan Province